Michael Welker (born 20 November 1947 in Erlangen, Germany) is a German Protestant theologian and a senior professor of Systematic Theology (Dogmatics).

Biblical Theology and “general theory” are the main foci of his research.  He reached a wider audience with publications about the Spirit of God, creation (especially in dialog with the sciences), the role of the church in pluralistic societies, resurrection and the Protestant view of the Lord’s Supper, but also with his work related to Alfred North Whitehead and process theology, to Niklas Luhmann and systems theory.

Biography, Academic and Ecclesiastical Activities
He went to school in West Berlin and in Grünstadt (Western Germany) and was ordained a minister of the Protestant church of the Palatinate.  In 1973 he received a PhD degree in Systematic Theology in Tübingen, Prof. Moltmann having been his advisor.  In 1978 he received another PhD degree under supervision of the philosopher Prof. Henrich.  In 1980 he completed his Habilitation in Tübingen, with his discussion of Whitehead and process philosophy.  From 1983 to 1987 he was professor for Systematic Theology in Tübingen, 1987–1991 he held the chair for Reformed Theology in Münster, and from 1991 to 2013 he was a professor for dogmatics in Heidelberg. Since 2013 he has been a senior professor at Heidelberg University and, since 2005, managing director of the Forschungszentrum Internationale und Interdisziplinäre Theologie (FIIT) in Heidelberg, which he co-founded. 
He lectured at the University of Chicago (1984), McMaster University (1985), Princeton Theological Seminary (1988 and 1995), the Center of Theological Inquiry, Princeton (1997, 1999), and at Harvard Divinity School (2001). In 2003 he was offered the position of the director of the Center of Theological Inquiry (CTI) in Princeton. 1996–2006 he was director of the Internationales Wissenschaftsforum Heidelberg (IWH). The University of Debrecen awarded him an honorary PhD degree, and so did the South African North-West University in Potchefstroom. 
From 2004 to 2016 he was a member of the chamber of theology of the council of the Protestant Church in Germany (EKD) and judge at the constitutional court of the EKD; since 2006 he has been a regular member of the Heidelberg Academy of Sciences and an affiliated member of the Finnish Academy of Arts and Letters. He was granted the Medal of Heidelberg University. Since 1984 he has given lectures in the USA, in several European countries, Korea, China, South Africa and Brazil; since 1991 he has given numerous endowed lectures (Harvard, Princeton, Yale, Chicago, Edinburgh, Beijing, Taipei, Canberra among others). 
During his commitment with the IWH and the CTI he organized numerous projects of international and interdisciplinary cooperation, research projects extended over several years, publications, especially concerning the dialog between theology and the sciences, and he still does so in connection with the FIIT. Since 2006 he has been building a Global Network of Research Centers for Theology, Religious and Christian Studies.

Selected works

Books

as Editor

External links 
 Digital Bibliography of Michael Welker: michael-welker.com

External links 

German Calvinist and Reformed theologians
20th-century Calvinist and Reformed theologians
21st-century Calvinist and Reformed theologians
20th-century German Protestant theologians
21st-century German Protestant theologians
1947 births
Harvard Divinity School
People from Erlangen
Systematic theologians
Living people
Academic staff of the University of Münster
University of Debrecen alumni
German male non-fiction writers